Nikhil Koratkar is the John A. Clark and Edward T. Crossan Endowed Chair Professor of Mechanical Engineering and Materials Science at Rensselaer Polytechnic Institute who has pursued research into one-dimensional (i.e., carbon nanotube) and two-dimensional (i.e., graphene, transition metal dichalcogenide and phosphorene) materials and devices.  In 2010, he was appointed Editor of the Elsevier journal CARBON.

He has a bachelor’s in aerospace engineering (1995) from the Indian Institute of Technology Bombay, a master’s in aerospace engineering (1998) and a doctorate in aerospace engineering (2000), both from the University of Maryland, College Park.

After receiving his doctorate degree, Koratkar joined the faculty of the Mechanical Engineering Department at Rensselaer Polytechnic Institute in 2001 as an assistant professor. He was promoted to associate professor in 2006 and to full professor in 2009. In 2011, Koratkar was also appointed a full professor in the Department of Materials Science and Engineering at Rensselaer. In 2012, Koratkar was appointed the John A. Clark and Edward T. Crossan Endowed Chair Professor at RPI.

References

External links
 Professor Koratkar's personal page at RPI

Rensselaer Polytechnic Institute faculty
IIT Bombay alumni
Living people
Year of birth missing (living people)